Michael Anthony Doyle (21 July 1935 – 28 January 2000) was an Irish television and film actor. He became widely known in Ireland as a then-radical priest in the popular Irish rural drama The Riordans, which began in 1965. He worked consistently in series, television films, and feature films throughout his life. He died unexpectedly in 2000, at the time playing in another well-known Irish rural drama, Ballykissangel.

Acting career
He first came to prominence playing a liberal Catholic priest - Father Sheehy - in RTÉ's iconic rural drama The Riordans. He appeared in such popular shows as Coronation Street, Between the Lines, 1990, Children of the North and Ballykissangel, and won an Irish Film and Television Academy Award for best leading performance for his role in the 1998 miniseries Amongst Women. Tony Doyle also appeared in the first Minder episode, "Gunfight at the OK Laundrette", playing a drunken Irishman.

His most famous film role saw Tony as the head of the SAS, Colonel Hadley, in the 1982 British film Who Dares Wins. His other film roles included appearances in Ulysses (1967), Quackser Fortune Has a Cousin in the Bronx (1970), Loophole (1981), Eat the Peach (1986), Secret Friends (1991), Damage (1992), Circle of Friends (1995), and as Tom French in I Went Down (1997).

He played George Ferguson in 10 episodes of Kay Mellor's Band of Gold TV drama from 1995 to 1996.

He was married to Sally and was the father of six children including the actress Susannah Doyle.

Death and legacy
He died at St Thomas's Hospital in Lambeth, London, England.

Brian Quigley, Doyle's Ballykissangel character, was written out of the show in the first episode of the final series where Quigley fakes his own suicide, supposedly drowning himself and fleeing to Brazil.

The Tony Doyle Bursary for New Writing was launched by the BBC following his death. Judges include his friend and Ballykissangel co-star Lorcan Cranitch.  Cranitch subsequently starred in the BBC detective series McCready and Daughter, which had been written with Doyle in mind.

Filmography

References

External links

BBC News article reporting his death
BBC News obituary to Tony Doyle

1935 births
2000 deaths
20th-century Irish male actors
Irish male film actors
Irish male soap opera actors
Irish male television actors
People from County Roscommon